Rana Randhir is a member of the Bharatiya Janata Party from Bihar. He served as Minister in Bihar Government. He has won the Bihar Legislative Assembly election in 2021 from Madhuban. His father was member of parliament.

References

Living people
People from East Champaran district
Bharatiya Janata Party politicians from Bihar
Bihar MLAs 2015–2020
Bihari politicians
Rashtriya Janata Dal politicians
Bihar MLAs 2005–2010
Bihar MLAs 2020–2025
1976 births